The Nurse is a 2017 American horror short film directed by Julian Terry. The film was written by Alexander Anderson and produced by Terry and Anderson. The short film is set in the Conjuring Universe and introduces a new demonic entity in the form of a nurse. The film stars Aria Walters and Hannah Palazzi and was released on YouTube on August 16, 2017. The short film was made in four days for a contest titled "My Annabelle Creation", which it won.

Plot 
Emily, a young girl with bandages wrapped around her eyes, suddenly hears the door to her ward opening and the scraping sound of a gurney moving. As she goes outside to investigate, holding on to her drip for balance, a strange nurse approaches, whom Emily cannot see. Panicking, she gets back to her ward and hits the call button for help. The nurse appears and tells Emily in a normal voice that she can remove the bandaging. After the nurse does so, Emily turns around to see the nurse’s disfigured, demonic face smiling back at her. Emily screams  in horror, leaving her fate unknown.

Cast 
 Aria Walters as Emily
 Hannah Palazzi as The Nurse

Release  
The short film was submitted for a contest called "My Annabelle Creation". On August 17, 2017, David F. Sandberg announced the winner for the contest, which ended up being The Nurse.

References

External links
 

2017 films
2017 horror films
American supernatural horror films
American horror short films
American ghost films
Films about nurses
Films set in hospitals
The Conjuring Universe
2010s English-language films
2010s American films